Unen (Mongolian and Buryat: Үнэн, Kalmyk: Үнн, Russian: Унэн, truth) refers to several newspapers in Mongolia and Mongolian-speaking parts of Russia:

 Mongoliin Ünen (Mongolia)
 Buryaad Ünen (Buryatia)

See also
Broad Front UNEN, an Argentine political party